The waxwings are three species of passerine birds classified in the genus Bombycilla. They are pinkish-brown and pale grey with distinctive smooth plumage in which many body feathers are not individually visible, a black and white eyestripe, a crest, a square-cut tail and pointed wings. Some of the wing feathers have red tips, the resemblance of which to sealing wax gives these birds their common name.  According to most authorities, this is the only genus placed in the family Bombycillidae, although sometimes the family is extended to include related taxa that are more usually included in separate families: silky flycatchers (Ptiliogonatidae (e.g. Phainoptila)), Hypocolius (Hypocoliidae), Hylocitrea (Hylocitreidae), palmchats (Dulidae) and the Hawai'ian 'honeyeaters' (Mohoidae). There are three species: the Bohemian waxwing (B. garrulus), the Japanese waxwing (B. japonica) and the cedar waxwing (B. cedrorum).

Waxwings are not long-distance migrants, but move nomadically outside the breeding season. Waxwings mostly feed on fruit, but at times of year when fruits are unavailable they feed on sap, buds, flowers and insects. They catch insects by gleaning through foliage or in mid-air. They often nest near water, the female building a loose nest at the fork of a branch, well away from the trunk of the tree. She also incubates the eggs, the male bringing her food to the nest, and both sexes help rear the young. Waxwings appear in art and have been mentioned in literature.

Etymology 
Bombycilla, the genus name, is Vieillot's attempt at Latin for "silktail", translating the German name Seidenschwänze. Vieillot analyzed motacilla, Latin for wagtail, as mota for "move" and cilla, which he thought meant "tail"; however, Motacilla actually combines motacis, a mover, with the diminutive suffix -illa. He then combined this "cilla" with the Latin bombyx, meaning silk.

Description
Waxwings are characterised by soft silky plumage. They have unique red tips to some of the wing feathers where the shafts extend beyond the barbs; in the Bohemian and cedar waxwings, these tips look like sealing wax, and give the group its common name. The legs are short and strong, and the wings are pointed. The male and female have the same plumage. All three species have mainly brown plumage, a black line through the eye and black under the chin, a square-ended tail with a red or yellow tip, and a pointed crest. The bill, eyes, and feet are dark. The adults moult between August and November, but may suspend their moult and continue after migration. Calls are high-pitched, buzzing or trilling monosyllables.

Behavior

Diet 
These are arboreal birds that breed in northern forests. Their main food is fruit, which they eat from early summer (strawberries, mulberries, and serviceberries) through late summer and fall (raspberries, blackberries, cherries, and honeysuckle berries) into late fall and winter (juniper berries, grapes, crabapples, mountain-ash fruits, rose hips, cotoneaster fruits, dogwood berries, and mistletoe berries). They pluck fruit from a perch or occasionally while hovering. In spring they replace fruit with sap, buds, and flowers. In the warmer part of the year they catch many insects by gleaning or in midair, and often nest near water where flying insects are abundant.

Reproduction 

Waxwings also choose nest sites in places with rich supplies of fruit and breed late in the year to take advantage of summer ripening. However, they may start courting as early as the winter. Pairing includes a ritual in which mates pass a fruit or small inedible object back and forth several times until one eats it (if it is a fruit).  After this they may copulate. Many pairs may nest close together in places with good food supplies, and a pair does not defend a territory—perhaps the reason waxwings have no true song—but a bird may attack intruders, perhaps to guard its mate.  Both birds gather nest materials, but the female does most of the construction, usually on a horizontal limb or in a crotch well away from the tree trunk, at any height. She makes a loose, bulky nest of twigs, grass, and lichen, which she lines with fine grass, moss, and pine needles and may camouflage with dangling pieces of grass, flowers, lichen, and moss. The female incubates, fed by the male on the nest, but once the eggs hatch, both birds feed the young.

Migration 
They are not true long-distance migrants, but wander erratically outside the breeding season and move south from their summer range in winter. In poor berry years huge numbers can irrupt well beyond their normal range, often in flocks that on occasion number in the thousands.

Taxonomy
Some authorities (including the Sibley-Monroe checklist) place some other genera in the family Bombycillidae along with the waxwings.  Birds that are sometimes classified in this way include the silky-flycatchers, the hypocolius, and the palm chat. Recent molecular analyses have corroborated their affinity and identified them as a clade, identifying the yellow-flanked whistler as another member.

Species

In popular culture

Waxwings are mentioned in the first lines of the poem "Pale Fire" by "John Shade", a fictional poet created by Vladimir Nabokov for his novel Pale Fire.

The waxwing identified in the Commentary to Pale Fire is a fictitious species. The novel's narrator claims that John Shade's father had a waxwing named for him, Bombycilla Shadei, and in noting the name corrects the taxonomical error: '(this should be shadei, of course)'.

The line "I was the shadow of the waxwing slain" was also used in the song "The Obituaries" by the band The Menzingers.

Waxwings are also mentioned in the song "Autumn" by Joanna Newsom.

References

External links

Waxwing videos on the Internet Bird Collection

 
Extant Miocene first appearances
Taxa named by Louis Jean Pierre Vieillot